Arès is a commune in the Gironde department in southwestern France.

Population

See also
Communes of the Gironde department
Pilgrims of Arès

References

Communes of Gironde
Populated coastal places in France